Steinle Turret Machine Company, now the Goodman Community Center, is located in Madison, Wisconsin, United States. It was added to the National Register of Historic Places in 2007.

History
The building was originally used by the American Shredder Company. Steinle Turret Machine Company purchased the building in 1909 and made multiple additions to it over the years, including during World War I, when the company experience a boom. In 1940, Kupfer Iron Works acquired the building. The site underwent transformations to become a community center in 2007.

References

External links 
 Community Center web site

Buildings and structures in Madison, Wisconsin
Community centers in the United States
Industrial buildings and structures on the National Register of Historic Places in Wisconsin
Industrial buildings completed in 1903
Ironworks and steel mills in the United States
National Register of Historic Places in Madison, Wisconsin